Kammerspielfilm is a type of German film that offers an intimate, cinematic portrait of lower middle class life.

History
The name derives from a theater, the Kammerspiele, opened in 1906 by a major stage director Max Reinhardt to stage intimate dramas for small audiences. Few Kammerspiel films were made, but nearly all are classics. Kammerspielfilme (the plural form) formed a German film movement of the 1920s silent film period that was developed around the same time as the more commonly known Expressionist movement in cinema. The Kammerspielfilm was known as the "chamber drama" as a result of the influence from the theatrical form of the chamber play. It is characterised by its focus on character psychology and its lack of intricate set design. Also, unlike Expressionist films, Kammerspielfilme seldom used intertitles to narrate the story.

Prominent figures
 Lupu Pick
 F. W. Murnau
 Carl Mayer
 Georg Wilhelm Pabst
 Carl Theodor Dreyer

See also
 Shattered
 The Last Laugh
 German Expressionism
 German film history
 Alfred Hitchcock – influenced by Kammerspielfilm

References

Sources

 Bordwell, David, and Kristin Thompson. 1997. Film Art: An Introduction. 5th, international ed. New York: McGraw-Hill. .
 Parkinson, David. 1995. History of Film. World of Art ser. London: Thames and Hudson. .

 *Kammerspielfilm
Movements in cinema
1920s in film